Silent Night, Deadly Night 5: The Toy Maker (also known simply as The Toy Maker) is a 1991 American horror film directed by Martin Kitrosser and stars Mickey Rooney, who had previously condemned the original film. It is the fifth film in the Silent Night, Deadly Night film series.

Additionally, Neith Hunter, Clint Howard and Conan Yuzna, who played Kim, Ricky and Lonnie in the previous film, make cameo appearances.

Plot 

Late one night in December, a young boy named Derek Quinn hears the doorbell ringing and goes downstairs and finds a Christmas present addressed to him on the porch. His father, Tom, reprimands him for being up so late and opening the door, sending him off to bed. Instead, Derek watches from the stairs as his curious father opens the gift. Finding a musical orb shaped like Santa Claus in the box, he activates it, causing it to strangle him with retractable cords. As Tom struggles, he slips and falls onto a fireplace poker, his impaled body being found by his wife Sarah a few moments later.

Two weeks later, Sarah takes Derek, who has not spoken since his father's death, to a toy store owned by the elderly Joe Petto and his odd son Pino, not realizing Noah Adams has followed them. After Derek rejects all the toys Joe shows him (and one called Larry the Larvae that Pino tries to give him), he and his mother leave, prompting Joe to begin angrily yelling at Pino, blaming him for all the store's recent failures. While running from his father, Pino bumps into Noah and drops the larvae toy, which Noah picks up and buys along with some other toys. At his home, Noah begins taking apart the toys he bought from Joe when he is confronted by his angry landlord Harold. Late paying rent, Noah, to smooth things over, gives Harold the Larry the Larvae toy in exchange for a one-day extension. While driving home, Harold is killed when Larry the Larvae crawls into his mouth and bursts out his eye, causing his car to crash and explode.

The next day, Sarah takes Derek to see Santa (portrayed by Noah, who takes his friend's shift) at the mall, finding another gift on the porch on the way out. While Sarah and Derek are gone, Pino sneaks into their house, using a key he had hidden years earlier when he and his father lived there. When Sarah and Derek get home early (due to Noah's odd behavior towards Derek), Pino flees from the house. After confronting Joe about Pino's intrusion (and stating that she will call the police the next time it happens) Sarah decides to let Derek open the present dropped off earlier, but Derek refuses to touch it. Leaving Derek alone, Sarah is visited by her friend Kim Levitt, and while the two talk, Derek sneaks outside and throws the present in a garbage can, where Kim's adopted son Lonnie finds it. Lonnie unwraps the gift and finds roller skates in it. In a drunken rage, Joe begins beating Pino, accidentally killing him by knocking him down some stairs. While using the skates, Lonnie is hit by a car and left hospitalized when rockets hidden within the skates cause him to lose control.

While Sarah visits Lonnie and Kim at the hospital, Derek is visited by Noah, who is shooed away by the babysitter Meridith, who tells Noah where to find Sarah when Noah keeps badgering her from outside. In the parking garage of Sarah's workplace, Noah, who is revealed to be Sarah's old boyfriend and Derek's real father, confronts her, and the two reconcile. At the Quinn house, Meridith and her boyfriend Buck have sex, involving a toy hand on his butt, a toy left by Joe dressed as Santa. Joe, who had broken into the home, has a horde of toys attack them while he abducts Derek, taking him to the toy store. Shortly before taking Sarah home, Noah tells her about Joe's past, saying he was arrested years earlier for booby-trapping toys he gave to children after his pregnant wife died in a car crash. Pulling into the driveway, Sarah and Noah find the hysterical and bloody Meridith, who tells them Buck is dead (having his head cut off by a circular saw attached to a toy car) and that Joe took Derek.

Sarah rushes to the toy store (followed by Noah) and starts looking around upstairs, arming herself with a knife. Joe attacks Noah with a remote control plane and an acid squirting water pistol in the basement, knocking him out. Hearing the noise, Sarah goes downstairs, finds the toys, and Sara demasks the non-toy person to find Joe's dead body and tries to run, only to be stopped by the Joe dressed as Santa. The imposter Joe removes his face (showing robotic components underneath) and puts on another, revealing himself to be Pino. Pino explains to Sarah that Joe created him to replace his dead son, but he could never live up to his father's expectations (as he was not "a real son") and was continually broken and rebuilt by Joe in his drunken rages. Pino says that he wants Sarah to be his mother (sending killer toys to try to kill Derek), then sexually assaults her while frantically screaming.

Sarah manages to stab Pino in the head with a screwdriver, causing him to begin malfunctioning. Grabbing the knife Sarah dropped earlier, Pino begins trying to stab Derek, whom he had placed in a large sack. Noah breaks into the room and starts fighting Pino, distracting him long enough for Sarah to halve him at the waist with an axe. Barely functioning, Pino cries for his father before grabbing Sarah's leg, causing her to stomp his head into pieces.

As Sarah, Derek, and Noah confront that these things are only toys, the eyes of one of Joe's partially assembled robots spark ominously, like Pino and his creations.

Cast

Release 
The film was released on VHS by Live Home Video in November 1991.

The film was released on DVD December 1, 2009 by Lionsgate in a box set with Silent Night, Deadly Night 3: Better Watch Out! and Silent Night, Deadly Night 4: Initiation.

On December 13, 2022, Silent Night, Deadly Night 5: The Toy Maker was released in a Blu-ray box set set with Silent Night, Dead Night 3: Better Watch Out! and Silent Night, Deadly Night 4: Initiation through Lionsgate's Vestron Video Collector's Series.

The film was also once featured in an episode of Svengoolie.

Reception 
JoBlo.com and Flickering Myth both gave the film favorable reviews, with Flickering Myth stating that while the film wasn't great, "The acting is of a level you’d expect, the story has some good twists and turns and it has an ending that will stay with you for a few days after the credits roll. To be honest, it’s worth watching just to see the ending". Bloody Disgusting also praised The Toy Maker, commenting that the film's bizarre scenes made it "one of the most fun horror sequels of all time, and the film is quite frankly the embodiment of everything that’s great about the fusion of horror and the most joyful holiday of them all".

In contrast, Tim Brayton of Antagony & Ecstasy wrote: "Junky direct-to-video pap, and only the fact that it does, for a brief spell, involve a murderous Santa Claus gives it any sort of leg up over the other films in its series".

See also 
 Killer Toys

References

External links 
 

1991 films
1991 horror films
1990s science fiction horror films
American sequel films
American Christmas horror films
Direct-to-video horror films
Direct-to-video sequel films
1990s English-language films
American robot films
Silent Night, Deadly Night films
1990s Christmas horror films
Films directed by Martin Kitrosser
1990s American films